The Institut für Nukleare Entsorgung (English: Institute for Nuclear Waste Disposal) is a large German research center at Karlsruhe Institute of Technology where R&D in the field of safe disposal of nuclear waste is being provided.

External links
Homepage

Nuclear research institutes
Research institutes in Germany